Katsutomo (written: ,  or ) is a masculine Japanese given name. Notable people with the name include:

, Japanese racing driver
, Japanese daimyō
, Japanese footballer

Japanese masculine given names